Odin Fjord is a fjord in Peary Land, far northern Greenland. 

Robert Peary did not explore the Frederick E. Hyde Fjord owing to thick fog at its mouth. The inner fjord branches were mapped and named by Lauge Koch in the course of aerial surveys from the 1920s onwards.

Geography
Thor Fjord has its mouth to the east on the same side.

Flowing northwards to the east of the Hans Tausen Ice Cap, the Ymer Glacier discharges at the head of the fjord. To the east of Odin Fjord lies the Heimdal Ice Cap.

See also
List of fjords of Greenland

References

External links
Collection: Peary Land, Odin Fjord Fm, JMH 780714-1, sam. 254799

Frederick E. Hyde Fjord